Georgemas is an area in the county of Caithness, in the Highland area of Scotland, about  south of the town of Thurso and about two kilometres (one mile) east of the village of Halkirk.

The area is served also by the A9, A882 and B874 roads. The A9 has a junction with the A882 in the area and forms a crossroads with the B874.

The name Georgemas is that of a now historic St George's Day agricultural fair which was held in the area, on Sordale Hill. Georgemas Junction, the station name, dates from 1874.

Rail transport
Georgemas has no real town or village centre of its own but it does have an unstaffed railway station called Georgemas Junction. The station is on the picturesque Far North Line and is the junction for the Wick and Thurso lines. It is located east of Scotscalder, west of Wick and south of Thurso. The station is managed by ScotRail.

External links 
 Caithness Community Website information about Georgemas Junction
 Ordnance Survey grid references: 
 For Georgemas Junction: 
 For A9-A882 junction:  
 For Sordale Hill: 

Caithness
Geography of Highland (council area)